Sadao (Malay: Sendawa) is district (amphoe) on the border of Malaysia in Songkhla province, southern Thailand. The capital of the district is also called Sadao town.

The small town of Danok, 13 km south of Sadao town in tambon Samnak Kham is the major border crossing between Thailand and Malaysia. The immigration, customs, quarantine and security checkpoint on the Malaysian side is called the Bukit Kayu Hitam ICQS checkpoint. A second smaller border crossing is in the district at Padang Besar, 12 km west of Sadao town.

Geography
Neighboring districts are (from the west clockwise): Khuan Don and Khuan Kalong of Satun province; Khlong Hoi Khong, Hat Yai, Chana, and Na Thawi of Songkhla Province. Southwest of Sadao's 85 kilometre border with Malaysia are the Malaysian states of Kedah and Perlis.

The district marks the southern end of Phetkasem Road, the longest road in Thailand, which runs from Bangkok via Hat Yai to the border crossing at Danok (Thailand)–Bukit Kayu Hitam (Malaysia). Major roads connect this road with Pattani (intersection at Khlong Ngae) and Padangbesar with the intersection at Sadao town.

Two main border crossings with Malaysia are in the district. The main crossing is at Danok with Bukit Kayu Hitam on the Malaysian side. The crossing is the busiest land border crossing between Thailand and Malaysia. Phetkasem Road is connected to Malaysia's North-South Expressway at this border crossing. Another crossing is at Padangbesar, with the Malaysian town of Padang Besar in Perlis on the Malaysian side. The main railway crossing between Malaysia and Thailand is also at Padang Besar.

The Thai-Malaysian border is porous, with illegal crossing points frequently discovered by authorities.

History
Historically Sadao is part of Kedah in the district of Changlun, which means 'elephant falls' in Thai. The district was formerly part of Changlun, and was then under the overlordship of Malay Sultanate of Kedah (known as Syburi in Thai). Sadao is called Sendawa in Malay.

When the Britain and Siam (Thailand) signed the Anglo-Siamese Treaty of 1909, deciding what belonged to whom, Changlun was divided into two parts. The main border town of Changlun became the district of Kubang Pasu, now in Kedah of Malaysia. The rest remained Thai. Tambon Sadao, together with the former minor district (king amphoe) Prik, forms modern Sadao.

Etymology
The name sadao is the Thai word for Neem tree.

Administration
The district is divided into nine sub-districts (tambons), which are further subdivided into 67 villages (mubans). The town (thesaban mueang) of Sadao covers tambon Sadao. Padangbesa is another town which covers parts of tambon Padangbesa. There are three sub-district municipalities (thesaban tambons): Prik and Phang La each cover parts of the same-named tambons, and Samnak Kham the full tambon Samnak Kham. There are a further seven tambon administrative organizations (TAO) responsible for the non-municipal areas.

Gallery

References

External links
amphoe.com (Thai)

Districts of Songkhla province
Malaysia–Thailand border crossings